Oleksandr Mykolayovych Litvinov (born 27 March 2002) is a Ukrainian professional footballer who plays as a right-back for Ukrainian First League club Dinaz Vyshhorod, on loan from Kolos Kovalivka.

References

External links
 
 

2002 births
Living people
Ukrainian footballers
Association football defenders
FC Kolos Kovalivka players
FC Dinaz Vyshhorod players
Ukrainian First League players